The 35th Annual Tejano Music Awards was held on October 24, 2015, at the Tobin Center for the Performing Arts in San Antonio, Texas.

The awards ceremony will be hosted by Efrain "Happy" Guerrero with performances from Tejano musicians Shelly Lares, Ruben Ramos, Hometown Boys, Isabel Marie, Emilio Navaira, Raulito Navaira, Xelencia, Las Fenix, Ricky Valenz, La Fiebre, Texadoz, Massore, David Farias, Da Krazy Pimpz, Pasty Torres, David Lee Garza, Oscar G, Aldaberto Gallegos, and Pete Astudillo. The event is expected to pay tribute to Selena, who was killed back in March 1995.

Nominees 
On September 5, it was announced that merengue group Grupo Fuego have been nominated for two awards. On September 23, Eagle Pass Business Journal announced several nominations for the 35th Tejano Music Awards.

References 

Tejano Music Awards by year
Tejano Music Awards
Tejano Music Awards
Tejano Music Awards
Tejano Music Awards